Harley-Davidson CVO ("Custom Vehicle Operations") for motorcycles are a family of models created by Harley-Davidson for the factory custom market. For every model year since the program's inception in 1999, Harley-Davidson has chosen a small selection of its mass-produced motorcycle models and created limited-edition customizations of those platforms with larger-displacement engines, costlier paint designs, and additional accessories not found on the mainstream models. Special features for the CVO lineup have included performance upgrades from Harley's "Screamin' Eagle" branded parts, hand-painted pinstripes, ostrich leather on seats and trunks, gold leaf incorporated in the paint, and electronic accessories like GPS navigation systems and iPod music players.

Design and manufacture
CVO models are produced in Harley-Davidson's York, Pennsylvania plant, where touring and Softail models are also manufactured. In each model year, CVO models feature larger-displacement engines than the mainstream models, and these larger-displacement engines make their way into the normal "big twin" line within a few years when CVO models are again upgraded. Accessories created for these customized units are sometimes offered in the Harley-Davidson accessory catalog for all models in later years, but badging and paint are kept exclusively for CVO model owners, and cannot be replaced without providing proof of ownership to the ordering dealer.

Model history

1999
FXR2 - Based on FXR frame with familiar 80-cubic-inch Evolution motor, added limited-edition billet and chromed components
FXR3

2000
FXR4 - Last of the Evolution-powered production motorcycles
Screamin' Eagle Road Glide FLTRSEI1 - Offered the Twin Cam engine with 95 cubic inch displacement for the first time

2001
FXDWG2 - Paint  was scarlet red with 23 carat gold leaf flames
Screamin' Eagle Road Glide FLTRSEI2

2002
FXDWG3
Screamin' Eagle Road King (FLHRSEI)

2003
Screamin' Eagle Deuce (FXSTDSE) - First CVO Softail
Screamin' Eagle Road King (FLHRSEI2) - Introduced the 103-cubic-inch Twin Cam motor

2004
Screamin' Eagle Deuce (FXSTDSE2) CVO limited blue/black, yellow/silver
Screamin' Eagle Electra Glide (FLHTCSE) (Blue and black, orange and black)

2005
Screamin' Eagle Fat Boy (FLSTFSE) - Introduced metal grind accents on the metalwork
Screamin' Eagle V-Rod (VRSCSE) - First CVO V-Rod
Screamin' Eagle Electra Glide (FLHTCSE2)

2006
Screamin' Eagle Fat Boy (FLSTFSE2)
Screamin' Eagle V-Rod (VRSCSE2)
Screamin' Eagle V-Rod Destroyer (VRXSE) - customized for performance in drag racing
Screamin' Eagle Ultra Classic Electra Glide (FLHTCUSE)

2007
2007 CVO models introduced the 110 inch Twin Cam motor in all models (the Softail used the 110B counterbalanced version).
Screamin' Eagle Dyna (FXDSE)
Screamin' Eagle Softail Springer (FXSTSSE)
Screamin' Eagle Road King (FLHRSE3)
Screamin' Eagle Ultra Classic Electra Glide (FLHTCUSE2)

2008
Screamin' Eagle Dyna (FXDSE2)
Screamin' Eagle Softail Springer (FXSTSSE2)
Screamin' Eagle Road King (FLHRSE4)
Screamin' Eagle Ultra Classic Electra Glide (FLHTCUSE3)

2009

In 2009, Harley-Davidson dropped the "Screamin' Eagle" name from its CVO models and began to refer to them as simply "CVO."
CVO Dyna Fat Bob (FXDFSE)
CVO Softail Springer (FXSTSSE3)
CVO Road Glide (FLTRSE3)
CVO Ultra Classic Electra Glide (FLHTCUSE4), which retained the Screaming Eagle logo on air cleaner cover and rear panel of trunk.

2010
CVO Fat Bob (FXDFSE2)
CVO Softail Convertible (FLSTSE) - Featured removable saddlebags and windshield
CVO Street Glide (FLHXSE)
CVO Ultra Classic Electra Glide (FLHTCUSE5)
CVO Ultra Classic Electra Glide Dark Side Limited Edition - Featured more blacked-out components, only 999 made.

2011
CVO Softail Convertible (FLSTSE2)
CVO Street Glide (FLHXSE2)
CVO Road Glide Ultra (FLTRUSE)
CVO Ultra Classic Electra Glide (FLHTCUSE6)

2012
CVO Softail Convertible (FLSTSE3)
CVO Road Glide Custom (FLTRXSE)
CVO Street Glide (FLHXSE3)
CVO Ultra Classic Electra Glide (FLHTCUSE7)

2013
CVO Breakout (FXSBSE)
CVO Road King (FLHRSE5)
CVO Road Glide Custom (FLTRXSE2)
CVO Ultra Classic Electra Glide (FLHTCUSE8)

2014
CVO Breakout (FXSBSE)
CVO Ultra Limited Electra Glide (FLHTKSE)
CVO Softail Deluxe (FLSTNSE)
CVO Road King (FLHRSE)

2015
CVO Softail Deluxe (FLSTNSE)
CVO Street Glide (FLHXSE)
CVO Road Glide Ultra (FLTRUSE)
CVO Limited (FLHTKSE)

2016
CVO Pro Street Breakout (FXSE)
CVO Street Glide (FLHXSE)
CVO Road Glide Ultra (FLTRUSE)
CVO Ultra Limited (FLHTKSE)
CVO Dyna LowriderS (FXDLS)

2017
CVO Pro Street Breakout (FXSE)
CVO Street Glide (FLHXSE)
CVO Ultra Limited (FLHTKSE)

2018
2018 CVO models introduced the  motor in all models 
CVO Street Glide (FLHXSE)
CVO Road Glide (FLTRXSE)
CVO Ultra Limited (FLHTKSE)

2019

CVO Street Glide (FLHXSE)
CVO Road Glide (FLTRXSE)
CVO Limited (FLHTKSE)

2020

CVO™ ROAD GLIDE® (FLTRXSE)
CVO™ TRI GLIDE® (FLHTCUTGSE)
CVO™ LIMITED (FLHTKSE)
CVO™ STREET GLIDE® (FLHXSE)
CVO™ TRI GLIDE

2021

CVO™ Limited
CVO™ Street Glide
CVO™ Road Glide
CVO™ Tri Glide

2022
CVO™ STREET GLIDE 
CVO™ ROAD GLIDE
CVO™ ROAD GLIDE LIMITED

Critical reception
Although CVO models carry a higher manufacturer's suggested retail price than the models from which they are derived and than the competing touring and cruiser motorcycles with which they compete, reviewers generally note that the price is a good value for the customizations they buy:

References

CVO